Jonas Enlund (born 3 November 1987 in Helsinki, Finland) is a Finnish professional ice hockey winger, currently an unrestricted free agent. He most recently played for HC Neftekhimik Nizhnekamsk in the Kontinental Hockey League (KHL).

Playing career 

Jonas Enlund is a product of the HIFK youth academy, but made his professional debut in the then Finnish SM-liiga for Tappara. Enlund was drafted in the sixth round, 165th overall, of the 2006 NHL Entry Draft by the Atlanta Trashers.

He played four full seasons for Tappara before moving to Russian team HC Sibir Novosibirsk, where he spent five years in the Kontinental Hockey League (KHL). Enlund spent most of the 2015–16 season with fellow KHL outfit Lokomotiv Yaroslavl and had a short stint at SKA St. Petersburg.

In July 2016, he signed with his fourth KHL club, CSKA Moscow, before transferring to HC Kunlun Red Star, the Chinese KHL side, in November 2016.

As a free agent leading into the 2019–20 season, Enlund opted to continue his career in the KHL, agreeing to a contract with HC Neftekhimik Nizhnekamsk on 12 October 2019.

Career statistics

Regular season and playoffs

International

References

External links

1987 births
Living people
Atlanta Thrashers draft picks
HC CSKA Moscow players
Finnish ice hockey forwards
HC Kunlun Red Star players
Lokomotiv Yaroslavl players
HC Neftekhimik Nizhnekamsk players
Ice hockey players at the 2018 Winter Olympics
Olympic ice hockey players of Finland
HC Sibir Novosibirsk players
SKA Saint Petersburg players
Ice hockey people from Helsinki
Tappara players
Traktor Chelyabinsk players